Giuseppe Antonio Ferretto (9 March 1899 – 17 March 1973) was an Italian Cardinal of the Roman Catholic Church who served as Major Penitentiary in the Roman Curia from 1967 to 1973, and was elevated to the rank of cardinal in 1961.

Biography
Ferretto was born in Rome to Tommaso and Adele (née Stazi) Ferretto. He studied at the Pontifical Roman Seminary (minor and major branches), the Pontifical Lateran University (where he obtained his doctorates in theology and canon and civil law), and the Pontifical Institute of Christian Archeology in Rome. Ordained to the priesthood on 24 February 1923, Ferretto finished his studies in 1926 and then taught at the Pontifical Lateran University and the Pontifical Urbaniana University until 1958. He served as an official in the Vicariate of Rome from 1929 to 1939, when he was made a referendary of the Apostolic Signatura on 23 April. Before becoming a canon of St. Peter's Basilica on 1 May 1953, he was named substitute (7 June 1943) and later assessor (27 June 1950) of the Sacred Consistorial Congregation.

He was also a noted archaeologist.

On 14 December 1958, Ferretto was appointed Titular Archbishop of Serdica by Pope John XXIII. He received his episcopal consecration in St. Peter's Basilica on the following 27 December from Pope John, with Bishops Girolamo Bortignon, OFM Cap and Gioacchino Muccin serving as co-consecrators. Ferretto was named Secretary of the College of Cardinals on 20 January 1959.

He was created cardinal priest of Santa Croce in Gerusalemme by Pope John in the consistory of 16 January 1961. There had been speculation that he had been one of the cardinals appointed in pectore on 28 March 1960, but his precedence in the College of Cardinals did not reflect such an appointment.

Ferretto was named Cardinal Bishop of Sabina e Poggio Mirteto on 26 March 1961. Pope John had recently changed the way cardinals were raised to the rank of cardinal bishop. Previously, the senior cardinal deacon and the senior cardinal priest had the right to opt for the title of cardinal bishop when one of the sees assigned to a cardinal bishop became vacant. Pope John made the appointment the prerogative of the pope. While the older method had ensured that only senior clerics of advanced age held the title of cardinal bishop, Pope John's first appointment under the new rule was Ferretto, who had just turned 62. A cardinal for just two months, he was the lowest ranking member of the order of cardinal priests.

He attended the Second Vatican Council from 1962 to 1965. He participated in the 1963 papal conclave, where he was also thought to be a possible candidate for election to the papacy. He was appointed Major Penitentiary on 7 April 1967. Pope Paul named him a participant in the first post-Vatican II Synod of Bishops in 1967. On 1 March 1973, he resigned as Major Penitentiary.

Ferretto died on 17 March 1973 in Rome, at age 74. He had been suffering from a heart condition. He is buried in the church of Immacolata e S. Benedetto Giuseppe Labre a via Taranto.

References

External links
 Cardinals of the Holy Roman Church
 Catholic-Hierarchy

1899 births
1973 deaths
20th-century Italian cardinals
Cardinal-bishops of Sabina
Pontifical Roman Seminary alumni
Participants in the Second Vatican Council
Major Penitentiaries of the Apostolic Penitentiary
Cardinals created by Pope John XXIII